Francis Adissa Kioyo (born 18 September 1979) is a German footballer of Cameroonian descent who played as a forward. Born in Yaoundé, Cameroon, he spent his professional career in Germany.

Personal life
In November 2007, he became a German citizen and lost Cameroonian citizenship.

References

1979 births
Living people
Footballers from Yaoundé
Association football forwards
German footballers
German people of Cameroonian descent
Cameroonian footballers
Cameroon under-20 international footballers
Cameroon international footballers
SpVgg Greuther Fürth players
1. FC Köln players
TSV 1860 Munich players
Rot-Weiss Essen players
FC Energie Cottbus players
Bundesliga players
2. Bundesliga players
3. Liga players
Israeli Premier League players
Maccabi Netanya F.C. players
FC Augsburg players
FC Aarau players
FC Amberg players
Expatriate footballers in Germany
Expatriate footballers in Israel
Expatriate footballers in Switzerland
Cameroonian expatriate footballers
Cameroonian expatriate sportspeople in Germany
Cameroonian expatriate sportspeople in Israel
Cameroonian expatriate sportspeople in Switzerland